Pamela Grace Burton (born September 16, 1948) is a landscape architect known for her interdisciplinary approach to private and public projects, bringing together plant materials, art, and architecture. In 2006 she became a fellow of the American Society of Landscape Architects (ASLA).

Education and philosophy
Burton was born in Santa Monica, California. She earned a bachelor's degree in Environmental Design and a Master's of Architecture from University of California, Los Angeles (UCLA) in 1975.

While attending UCLA, Burton worked at ACE Gallery and participated in the installation of earth-work artists, including Robert Smithson and Michael Heizer. Helping to construct Sol LeWitt’s ephemeral wall drawings, she was inspired by the way the colors overlapped. Likewise, Robert Irwin’s scrim pieces and Elyn Zimmerman’s observations of nature through photography, graphite drawings, and stone and water environments informed her about working with light, space, and perception. "Landscapes are a journey.  It’s not just about the destination, but also about the journey of designing and walking through them…  One of the most important things about any practice is cultivating awareness, something artists specialize in.  Whenever we have an idea, it’s always amplified by the mysterious things that are about to happen.  You can only take advantage of them if you are aware of them."

Burton's awareness of architecture and landscape as complementary forms of the same process was confirmed when she took time off from studying at UCLA to visit Japan. There, in the gardens and temples, she observed the power of aesthetic simplicity and experienced the fusion of nature and architecture. “I like to think of the garden and landscape in the context of a big idea.”

To demonstrate how modernist ideas were embedded in the mid-century gardens and houses of A. Quincy Jones, Joseph van der Kar, John Lautner, Richard Neutra, Rudolph Schindler, and many more, Burton wrote, with Marie Botnick and Kathryn Smith, the book Private Landscapes: Modernist Gardens in Southern California.

Throughout Burton's career she has been influenced and informed by where she lived — the hills of Malibu and the valley of Ojai.  She learned repeatedly that the success and value of spaces are not always seen immediately; they are felt.  Many defining edges and threshold meetings can go into making a space resonant: proportions of inside and outside, light and shadow, nature and cultivation, social needs and solitude.  Her living spaces became places to experiment and explore by instinct; if she fell, she didn't hurt herself.  She replanted.  “Burton’s own garden has developed around her favorite themes: formal outdoor rooms casually appointed, flowing water, the wild world seen beyond the garden, the use of plants to narrate a human story.”

In the end, a garden takes on its own layers of time and meaning, and Burton does not feel she needs to spell them out completely.  She has come to be satisfied if it appears as if she didn't do anything.  Arriving at that point has taken a tremendous amount of work; it is the constant process of editing that lets a garden age and endure, deepening and leaning into its own story.  “I’m passionate about places that resonate, about places that make you think and long and remember.”

Professional practice
Pamela Burton's projects include private residences and public landscapes in California, Idaho, New Mexico, New York, Australia, Brazil, and Japan. Plants provide beauty and satisfaction. By giving back to the earth, we’re making our own lives richer. The way we treat our landscapes is the way we treat ourselves.”

Early projects like The Bonhill Residence show the importance of adopting a strong design that accommodates change over time.  The Colton Avenue Streetscape for the University of Redlands was important for the way it helped to assimilate the campus with the surrounding community.  The Cantitoe Farm project relied on ideas related to creating in-between, terraced garden rooms that could be inhabited.  For the Calabasas Civic Center, the concentration was on building attractive, sustainable spaces for the community.  Asked by Dwell to critique outdoor furniture, “Burton visited several Los Angeles retailers.  Her distinctive approach to analyzing each piece was both insightful and playful (she often lingers on the sound of things, particularly names, and whimsically forgoes English for Spanish.” 

Many projects incorporate native California plants and have water and the conservation of water as primary to their designs.  The Palm Canyon Residence in Malibu is designed as a comfortable refuge for a large family; it incorporates a pepper tree allee, olive grove, and planted steps.  The School of the Arts Plaza, for the University of California, Irvine project with Maya Lin, has become a central meeting place as well as an exploration of our five senses.  Red Tail Ranch in Santa Ynez relies ultimately on natural rainfall for its timeless oak grassland.  The Santa Monica Public Library uses water as its primary metaphor and includes shallow pools in the middle of the courtyard to provide relief from hot summer days.  "Well before LEED certification existed, Burton advocated native and drought-happy plants. A 200,000-gallon underground cistern fed by rainwater irrigates her gardens at the Santa Monica Public Library."

Recent projects pare down landscape to its essence, with a clear hierarchy of spaces that simplifies the overall structure and can be complemented by a rich palette of plant materials.  La Mesa Residence integrates a series of small courts with their adjacent spaces: library, dining, study, and living.  At the Colorado Center, Burton brought to life an office complex by enhancing and rethinking its context.  At the East Fork Residence, at an elevation of seven thousand feet, Burton anchored the house to structural terraces planted with flowering crab apple trees and created veils of native trees through which to view the house.  In São Paulo, she created multiple refuges for office workers and the public.  In all of this work, the intention was to create layers of discovery and experience.  Referring to Burton's work on Hesperides in Montecito, Donna Dorian writes, “That the house and garden have made such a brilliant transition into the new millennium has much to do with the prodigious talent of Santa Monica landscape architect Pamela Burton.”

She served for six years on the Design Review Board at the University of California, Santa Barbara, three years on the Design Review Board of the University of California, Riverside and three years on the Architectural Review Board of the city of Santa Monica.

Relationship with the environment

As a landscape architecture, Pamela Grace Burton has been instilled with respect for the workings of its nature forces and environment. In her point of view, “To begin to understand where you live and how to cultivate your surroundings, it is important to internalize these forces of nature and its environment -the cycle of the earth, air, fire, and water.”   Which means the better understand the environment such as the topographical features, the better the design of the building and garden can merge with the nearby natural environment. Pamela Burton regrades a garden or landscape as a big idea- “one that is simple. Harmonious, and perceptible.” 

During her undergraduate years at the University of California, Los Angeles (UCLA), when she studies, she found that what she wants most was to create a landscape, and by changing the landscape to achieve the best use of the site, and it also related to the environment. Then, she noticed that “elements such as openings, lighting, temperature (shade and water), sounds, and furnishing also can be considered as a good way to show the relationship with its surroundings.”
  
Later, at the time during her study in Japan, by visiting the gardens and temples, she observed that the power of aesthetic simplicity and experienced the way in which the fusion of nature and architecture connected her to something infinite and deep. After that, she realized how she wants to approach these qualities to her own work. So, merge into the boundary of the space is important to Pamela, and later when she designs her work, she always strove to study the site and its environment.

And over the years, she has found the most important thing to maintain a balance between four areas of the creative life: looking, thinking, drawing, and making. “thinking is about analyzing and making conceptual connections between its environment; drawing is about recording insights, taking imaginative leaps, and bringing ideas and images of oneself and putting them onto paper.”
In her work, it is easy to find a relationship with the natural environment. For example, Red Tail Ranch is a project located in a paradigmatic California landscape of golden rolling hills and oak trees. To merge it into the natural environment, Pamela and her team design the house go to sit on the land, like a saddle, with the ridge running through it like the backbone of a horse. So, the project became an exercise in restraint, letting the house recline comfortably into the landscape and become part of the mountains.

In the book “Pamala Burton Landscapes “there shows many of her projects, and most of them show the relationship with the environment.

Recent Awards

2020

Modelo

-2020 Citation Award, Westside Urban Forum Design Awards (w/ Tighe Architecture)

Pathway to Home Ownership

-2020 Citation Award, Westside Urban Forum Design Awards (w/ EYRC Architects)

UCSD Jacobs Medical Center

-2020 Award of Merit, ASLA San Diego Design Awards

Los Angeles LGBT Center Anita May Rosenstein Campus

-2020 AIA New York Design Awards, Architecture Honor Award, Cultural Category

-2020 Honor Award, Westside Urban Forum Design Awards (w/ KFA Architecture)

Tartine Bakery at 1925 Arizona

-2020 Rehabilitation and Adaptive Reuse Award, Santa Monica Conservancy

2019

Aquarium of the Pacific, Pacific Visions

-2019 Los Angeles Business Journal Commercial Real Estate Awards, Best Public Project, Gold

Erewhon Santa Monica

-2019 Los Angeles Architectural Awards – Award of Excellence (Renovated Buildings Award), Los Angeles Business Council

Los Angeles LGBT Center Anita May Rosenstein Campus

-2019 SCDF Design & Philanthropy Awards – Southern California Development Forum (SCDF)

UCLA Geffen Academy

-2019 Renovation Award, Association for Learning Environments (with KEA)

Santa Monica High School Discovery Building

-2019 AIA SFV Design Awards, Education, Citation Award, (with Harley Ellis Devereaux)

Umeo Residence (The Palisades House)

-2019 AIA SFV Design Awards, Residential, Honor Award, (with Abramson Architects)

2018

Howard Residence

-2018 Quality of Life Design Awards – American Society of Landscape Architecture, Southern
California Chapter Awards, Merit Award

Erewhon Santa Monica

-2018 Design & Philanthropy Awards – Southern California Development Forum, Interiors Award (with Montalba Architects)

Wiseburn High School

-2018 Design & Philanthropy Awards – Southern California Development Forum, Interiors Award (with Gensler)

-2018 Built Category: Award of Honor, Association for Learning Environments (with Gensler)

Pamela Burton

-2018 Modern Masters Awards, Los Angeles Conservancy, Modern Master Award for Excellence in Landscape Architecture

2017

Metro Division 14 Expo Light Rail Operations & Maintenance Facility

-2017 Award of Merit, Airport/Transit – Southern California, Engineering News-Record (ENR)

UCSD Jacobs Medical Center

-2017 Award of Merit, Health Care – Southern California, Engineering News-Record (ENR)

-2017 Honorable Mention, Civic/Educational, Best of Design Awards, The Architect’s Newspaper

2016

Aqueduct Centennial Garden

-American Society of Landscape Architecture, Southern California Chapter Awards, Merit Award

Crossroads School Science Education & Research Facility

-2016 Best Projects Award, K-12 Education- California Region, Engineering News-Record

Disney’s Grand Central Air Terminal

-2016 Preservation Design Award, California Preservation Foundation

Wilshire Courtyard, Los Angeles, California

-Westside Urban Forum 2016 Westside Prize Award, Public/Open Space. Citation. Michael Maltzan Architecture, Inc.

Designing for Drought, LADWP Landscape Templates

-American Society of Landscape Architecture, Southern California Chapter Awards, Merit Award

-Westside Urban Forum 2016 Westside Prize Award, Plans/Policy. Merit. Los Angeles Department of Water and Power

2015

Edison Language Academy, Santa Monica, California

-AIA California Council Honor Award, Kevin Daly Architects

Providence Saint John’s Phase 2 Master Plan, Santa Monica, California

-AIA California Council Award in the Urban Design Category. Perkins Eastman + Moore Ruble Yudell Architects & Planners

The Row Flagship Store, Los Angeles, California

-AIA California Council Merit Award. Montalba Architects

Selected projects

2016 LUMINA, San Francisco, California
2016 Glendale Central Air Terminal, Glendale, California
2015 Anita May Rosentein LGBT Center, Hollywood, California
2012 Archer School for Girls, Los Angeles, California
2011 The Century, Century City, California
2010 Valley Performing Arts Center, California State University, Northridge
2009 São Paulo Rochavera Esplanade, São Paulo, Brazil
2006 Farmer's Market, Third and Fairfax, Los Angeles, California
2005 Santa Monica Public Library, Santa Monica, California
2004 Colorado Center, Santa Monica, California
1998 Gilbert Residence, Brentwood, California
1997 Colton Avenue Street Scape, University of Redlands, Redlands, California
1995 Art Science Walk, Scripps College, Claremont, California
1994 Escondido Performing Arts Center, Escondido, California
1992 Biddy Mason Park, Los Angeles, California (Burton and Spitz)
1976 Nilsson Residence
1975 Jencks Residence

Bibliography
 Private Landscapes (2014), Princeton Architectural Press,  
 Pamela Burton Landscapes (2010), Princeton Architectural Press, 
 ''Burton, Pamela, and Kathryn Smith. Private Landscapes: Modernist Gardens in Southern California. New York: Princeton Architectural, 2014.}

References

External links 

Cornerstone Sonoma
Greensource – Magazine for Sustainable Design
ASLA 2008 Residential Design Honor Award for Malibu Beach House
Land8: Global Connection to Landscape Architecture
Landscape Online

American landscape architects
Women landscape architects
1948 births
Living people
American women architects
American women in business
California people in design
Architects from Los Angeles
Writers from Santa Monica, California
UCLA School of the Arts and Architecture alumni
20th-century American architects
21st-century American architects
20th-century American women artists
21st-century American women artists